The discography of the American rock and emo band American Football consists of three studio albums, two extended plays (EP), four singles and eight music videos. Because all three albums are eponymous, they are known as LP1, LP2, and LP3. The band was formed in 1997 in Urbana, Illinois, by Mike Kinsella, Steve Lamos, and Steve Holmes while they were students at the University of Illinois at Urbana-Champaign. A year later, they released a self-titled EP, followed by their debut studio album, American Football (LP1), in 1999. Shortly after, the band graduated from college, and not expecting the album to receive any attention, broke up.

LP1's music and enigmatic cover art, which shows a green tinted picture of a white house in Urbana, developed a word-of-mouth cult following, and today is considered a central influence on the 2010s emo revival. In 2014, Polyvinyl Records re-released LP1 as a deluxe edition, which reached number 68 on the Billboard 200. Its success led to the band reforming for a series of live shows that year, for which they recruited Nate Kinsella, Mike Kinsella's nephew. In 2016, they released their second album, American Football (LP2), which reached number 82 on the Billboard 200 and number 3 on the Independent Albums chart. They followed up with American Football (LP3), and an extended play of early demos, Year One Demos, in 2019. LP3 and Year One Demos reached numbers 4 and 44 respectively on the Independent Albums chart; although neither record reached the Billboard 200.

Albums

Extended plays

Singles

Music videos

References

Notes

Citations

Post-hardcore group discographies
Discographies of American artists